Michael Wetungu (born April 25, 1998) is an American soccer player who plays as a defender.

Career

College and amateur 
Up to 2016, Wetungu played with the USSDA academy team Vardar, before Wetungu attended and played four years of college soccer at Michigan State University between 2016 and 2019. During his time with the Spartans, Wetungu made 72 appearances and scoring 3 goals as a central defender. He was named to the Big Ten All-Freshman team in his freshman year.

While in college, Wetungu played with USL League Two sides Flint City Bucks (formerly Michigan Bucks) and Lansing United. He also played with Lansing United in the NPSL prior to their move to the USL.

Professional 
On January 9, 2020, Wetungu was selected 46th overall in the 2020 MLS SuperDraft by Real Salt Lake. Wetungu signed for the club's USL Championship affiliate Real Monarchs on February 5, 2020.

Wetungu made his professional debut on September 16, 2020, starting in a 2–1 loss to Portland Timbers 2.

His option was declined by Real Monarchs following the 2020 season.

References

External links 
 MLS Michael Wetungu | MLSsoccer.com
 Real Salt Lake Michael Wetungu | Real Salt Lake

1998 births
Living people
American soccer players
Association football defenders
Flint City Bucks players
Michigan State Spartans men's soccer players
National Premier Soccer League players
People from Rochester Hills, Michigan
Real Monarchs players
Real Salt Lake draft picks
Soccer players from Michigan
USL Championship players
USL League Two players